Stade Communal is a football stadium in Mondercange, in south-western Luxembourg.  It is currently the home stadium of FC Mondercange.  The stadium has a capacity of 3,300.

References
FC Mondercange - Website

Communal, Mondercange
Mondercange